The 2019–20 Armenian First League season was the 28th since its establishment. The season was launched on August 6, 2019, and concluded on May 27, 2020. Sevan are the defending champions.

Summary
A total of 17 clubs entered the competition with only 11 clubs being eligible for promotion, while the other 6 teams are the reserve teams of clubs from the Armenian Premier League.

Team changes
Junior Sevan FC were renamed Sevan FC.
FC Ani from Yerevan, a newly-founded club in 2019.
FC Aragats from Ashatarak, a newly-founded club in 2019.
BKMA Yerevan from Yerevan , existed between 1947 and 1993, re-founded in 2019 (home venue in Vagharshapat).
Dilijan FC from Dilijan, a newly-founded club in 2018, joined the league in 2019.
Lernayin Artsakh FC from Stepanakert, left the Artsakh Football League to play in Armenian First League instead. Since clubs playing in Armenian leagues cannot play games in Artsakh, Lernayin Artsakh will play their home games in Sisian instead.
Masis FC from Masis, a newly-founded club in 2019.
FC Torpedo Yerevan from Yerevan, a newly-founded club in 2019 (home venue in Abovyan).
FC Van from Charentsavan, a newly-founded club in 2019.
FC West Armenia from Yerevan, a newly-founded club in 2019.

Promoted to 2019–20 Armenian Premier League:
FC Yerevan as 2018–19 Armenian First League runners-up.

Although Junior Sevan were reigned as champions, however, they did not gain promotion to the 2019–20 Armenian Premier League, due to not meeting the requirements of the Football Federation of Armenia to take part at the Armenian Premier League competition. Instead, runners-up Yerevan gained promotion, as they met the above-mentioned requirements.

Stadiums and locations

League table

Results

Season statistics

Top scorers

References

External links

Armenian First League seasons
2019–20 in Armenian football
Armenia